Transcription factor AP-2 alpha (Activating enhancer binding Protein 2 alpha), also known as TFAP2A, is a protein that in humans is encoded by the TFAP2A gene.

Function 

Transcription factor AP-2 alpha is a 52-kD sequence-specific DNA-binding protein that enhances transcription of specific genes by binding to a GC-rich DNA sequence first identified in the cis-regulatory region of SV40 virus DNA and in cis-regulatory regions of a variety of cellular genes. 

The TFAP2-alpha gene was isolated and found to be retinoic acid-inducible in NT2 teratocarcinoma cells suggesting a potential role for AP-2 alpha in cellular differentiation. 

During embryonic development, AP-2 alpha is expressed in neural crest cells migrating from the cranial neural folds during neural tube closure, and is also expressed in ectoderm, parts of the central nervous system, limb buds, and mesonephric system suggesting that AP-2 alpha plays an important role in the determination and development of these tissues.  Cranial neural crest cells populate the developing face and provide patterning information for craniofacial morphogenesis and generate most of the skull bones and the cranial ganglia. 

AP-2 alpha knockout mice die perinatally with cranio-abdominoschisis and severe dysmorphogenesis of the face, skull, sensory organs, and cranial ganglia.  Homozygous knockout mice also have neural tube defects followed by craniofacial and body wall abnormalities. In vivo gene delivery of AP-2 alpha suppressed spontaneous intestinal polyps in the Apc(Min/+) mouse. AP-2 alpha also functions as a master regulator of multiple transcription factors in the mouse liver.

In melanocytic cells TFAP2A gene expression may be regulated by MITF.

Clinical significance 

Mutations in the TFAP2A gene cause Branchio-oculo-facial syndrome often with a midline cleft lip. In a family with branchio-oculo-facial syndrome (BOFS), a 3.2-Mb deletion at chromosome 6p24.3 was detected. Sequencing of candidate genes in that region in 4 additional unrelated BOFS patients revealed 4 different de novo missense mutations in the exons 4 and 5 of the TFAP2A gene.

A disruption of an AP-2 alpha binding site in an IRF6 enhancer is associated with cleft lip.   Mutations in IRF6 gene cause Van der Woude syndrome (VWS) that is a rare mendelian clefting autossomal dominant disorder with lower lip pits in 85% of affected individuals. The remaining 15% of individuals with Van der Woude syndrome show only cleft lip and/or cleft palate (CL/P) and are clinically indistinguishable from the common non syndromic CL/P. NSCL/P occur in approximately 1/700 live births and is one of the most common form of congenital abnormalities. A previous association study between SNPs in and around IRF6 and NSCL/P have shown significant results in different populations and was independently replicated.

A search of NSCL/P cases for potential regulatory elements for IRF6 gene was made aligning genomic sequences to a 500 Kb region encompassing IRF6 from 17 vertebrate species. Human sequence as reference and searched for multispecies conserved sequences (MCSs). Regions contained in introns 5’ and 3’ flanking IRF6 were screened by direct sequencing for potential causative variants in 184 NSCL/P cases.  The rare allele of the SNP rs642961 showed a significant association with cleft lip cases. Analysis of transcription factor binding site analysis showed that the risk allele disrupt a binding site for AP-2 alpha.

Mutations in the AP-2 alpha gene also cause branchio-oculo-facial syndrome, which has overlapping features with Van der Woude syndrome such as orofacial clefting and occasional lip pits what make rs642961 a good candidate for an etiological variant. These findings show that IRF6 and AP-2 alpha are in the same developmental pathway and identify a variant in a regulatory region that contributes substantially to a common complex disorder.

Interactions 

TFAP2A has been shown to interact with:
 APC
 CITED2
 DEK
 EP300
 Myc and
 P53.

See also 
 Activating protein 2
 Branchio-oculo-facial syndrome

References

Further reading

External links 
  GeneReviews/NCBI/NIH/UW entry on Branchiooculofacial Syndrome
 
 
 
 

Transcription factors